Yoon Jun-sung (born 28 September 1989) is a South Korean footballer who plays as a defender for FC Anyang of K League 2.

Career
Yoon was selected by Pohang Steelers in 2012 K League draft.

He moved to Daejeon Citizen in January 2015.

References

External links 

1989 births
Living people
Association football defenders
South Korean footballers
Expatriate footballers in Thailand
South Korean expatriate footballers
South Korean expatriate sportspeople in Thailand
Pohang Steelers players
Daejeon Hana Citizen FC players
Gimcheon Sangmu FC players
Suwon FC players
Yoon Jun-sung
FC Anyang players
K League 1 players
K League 2 players
Yoon Jun-sung